William Corbett may refer to:
William Corbett (composer) (1680–1748), English composer and violinist
William Henry Corbett (1847–1941), Canadian politician
William Corbett (politician) (1902–1971), Governor of Guam
Willie Corbett (1922–2011), Scottish footballer
William Corbett (poet) (1942–2018), American poet and educator
William C. Corbett (1944–2010), Clerk of the House of Commons of Canada

See also
Bill Corbett (born 1960), American actor and puppeteer
William Corbet (disambiguation)
William Corbitt (1854–1922), American politician from Virginia
Corbett (surname)